The Titikaveka by-election was a by-election in the Cook Islands seat of Titikaveka.  It took place on 7 February 2007.

At the 2006 election, Robert Wigmore won the seat of Titikaveka by a significant margin.  However, his election was subsequently challenged in an electoral petition on the grounds that as a board member of the Cook Islands Investment Corporation Wigmore was technically a public servant and thus ineligible to sit.  The petition was successful and a by-election was called.

The poll was won by the Democratic Party's Robert Wigmore. Turnout was significantly reduced from the general election.

References

By-elections in the Cook Islands
2007 elections in Oceania
2007 in the Cook Islands